Akuapem may refer to:
 Akuapem people, an ethnic group of Ghana
 Akuapem dialect, their language
 Akuapem Kingdom, a former kingdom

See also 
 

Language and nationality disambiguation pages